Glee Sides and Sparities is a 2003 compilation album by Australian alternative rock band, Jebediah. The compilation contains eighteen rare tracks and B-sides and the band did not record any further material with the Murmur label following its release.

New releases
Two newly released songs featured on the compilation: "Minutes" and "Pace It", a cover version of the Magic Dirt song. The album also features an unreleased demo version of "Closing Time" (a B-side from the "Nothing Lasts Forever" single).

Cover versions
In addition to "Pace It", the album also contains covers of Midnight Oil's track "When the Generals Talk" (from a tribute album called Power and the Passion) and Something for Kate's "Clint".

Track listing

References

2003 compilation albums
Jebediah albums
Murmur (record label) albums
B-side compilation albums